"I Surrender" is a power ballad written by Louis Biancaniello and Sam Watters, and recorded by Canadian singer Celine Dion from her seventh English-language studio album, A New Day Has Come (2002). A lushly orchestrated love song that has been covered numerously, it is about an enamoured individual who would surrender everything just to be with their lover.

Background
Having a tempo of 57 beats per minute with syncopation, the song is written in the key of G minor and it would feature piano, string ensemble, drums and a synthesizer. The chorus uses the common chord progression of vi–IV–I–V, with Dion's vocal range spanning from note D3 to D5. It uses a Neapolitan chord of Ab major before a suspended chord at the end of the verses. The song was described as a "bombastic, heart-pounding" ballad, which has become a popular song choice for contestants on reality television singing competitions like American Idol. The song was produced and arranged by Grammy award winner and Golden Globe nominee Simon Franglen.

Reception
According to Chuck Taylor from Billboard, "Dion does not disappoint with ballads like the rafter-shaking 'I Surrender' where she sings of forbidden love amid a firestorm of utterly volcanic instrumentation". People Magazine wrote, "When Dion sings about letting down her defenses and giving in to love on "I Surrender", it's the song that gets belted into submission." Slant Magazine critic Sal Cinqueman states that 'I Surrender' is a "power ballad only a singer with Dion's voice could pull off." Christopher Smith from TalkAboutPopMusic said that it "has much drama and theatrics, so much so that you almost begin to think the producers are really looking to shape Celine into the next Barbra Streisand rather than herself."

Live performance
Celine Dion performs this song in her video album Live in Las Vegas: A New Day..., where she is surrounded by artistic backup dancers, who visually and dramatically express the song's lyrics in a miming manner. The clip is on her VEVO account on YouTube, acting as the official music video of the song, and has over 37 million views of as January 2019. The music video starts when backup dancers are running to their positions and imitating statues, the Versailles-style crystal chandelier was used to make the song performance more romantic  "I Surrender" from the DVD was first released on the deluxe edition of Dion's album Taking Chances from November 2007.  The song was also performed in most her concerts from her second Las Vegas residency show, Celine (concert residency) from 2015 through 2018.

Other covers
American singer Billy Gilman covers this song on season 11 of The Voice with standing ovation from all four judges. For a second week in a row, Gilman's performance, this time for "I Surrender" featured at number one on iTunes allowing him to benefit from the five times multipliers vote totals again.
Taiwanese singer Terry Lin covers the song in 2008.
Filipino singer Alisah Bonaobra performed "I Surrender"  in the second season of The Voice of the Philippines.
Filipino-American singer Jessica Sanchez performs the song on the first season of America's Got Talent at the age of 11. Singer and judge Brandy Norwood predicts, "You’re gonna be huge, I promise," after seeing her perform it. The cover has over eight million views on YouTube.
American Idol winner Kelly Clarkson covered the song in 1990s week, as a top 4 finalist.
American Idol finalist Anthony Fedorov performed the song on the show's fourth season.
Spanish singer Abraham Mateo covers the song on his YouTube account in 2010 at the age of 12. The video has over 5 million views.
Cosima DeVito performed the song for her audition on the first season of Australian Idol.
British singer Nicki French recorded and released a dance version of the song as a single in 2004.
American singer Mary Griffin's version of 'I Surrender' was recorded before Celine's, and released on her 2002 album 'Purified'.
Polish singer Edyta Górniak recorded a polish version of the song. The cover is called "List" ("Letter").
English singer and Steps member Claire Richards covered the song on 2012 Steps tour, “The Ultimate Tour”.
Jeanick Fournier, the second-season winner of Canada's Got Talent, performed "I Surrender" as her first audition, receiving the golden buzzer from host Lindsay Ell. After winning the season, she released her major label debut album, which also included a cover of the song.

References

External links
 

2002 songs
Celine Dion songs
Pop ballads
2000s ballads
Songs about heartache
Torch songs
Songs written by Louis Biancaniello
Songs written by Sam Watters